Reza Moridi (born ) is a former politician in Ontario, Canada. He was a Liberal member of the Legislative Assembly of Ontario from 2007 to 2018 who represented the riding of Richmond Hill. He served as a cabinet minister in the government of Kathleen Wynne. He was the first Iranian-Canadian elected to legislature  and appointed as a Cabinet minister in Canada.

Background
Moridi was born in Urmia, capital of West Azerbaijan Province in northwest Iran. He grew up in Urmia, attended Alborz High School in Tehran and graduated from Tehran University with BSc and MSc degrees in Physics. He continued his education in the UK and obtained MTech and PhD degrees from Brunel University in London. He received an Honorary Doctorate from Odlar Yurdu University, Baku, Azerbaijan.

For his contributions to physics and engineering, Moridi was elected Fellow of the Institute of Physics and Fellow of the Institution of Engineering and Technology of the UK. In recognition of his contributions to the understanding of nuclear materials and radiation, the Canadian Nuclear Society presented him with the Education and Communication Award. Also, in recognition of his contributions to the profession of Health Physics, the Health Physics Society of the United States presented him with the Fellow Award. Moridi has received numerous awards and recognitions for his extensive community and humanitarian work.

Prior to entering into politics, he was a Chartered Engineer and Chartered Physicist. He worked for 17 years at the Radiation Safety Institute of Canada where he was the Vice-President and Chief Scientist. He also worked in the electrical industry as an executive and in academia as a professor and administrator.

Politics 

Moridi ran as the Liberal candidate in the 2007 provincial election in the riding of Richmond Hill. He defeated Progressive Conservative Alex Yuan by 5,329 votes. He was re-elected in 2011, and 2014. Moridi was defeated in the 2018 Provincial Election by Conservative Member of Provincial Parliament Daisy Wai. He intended to contest his former seat as a Member of Provincial Parliament for Richmond Hill in four years in 2018. Last year in 2020, Moridi formally announced that he will not going to run in the next election.

During the Dalton McGuinty government he served as Parliamentary Assistant to the Ministers of Training, Colleges and Universities, Research and Innovation and Energy. When Kathleen Wynne took over as Premier in 2013, she appointed Moridi to her cabinet as Ministry of Research and Innovation. After the 2014 election she assigned him the additional role of Ministry of Training, Colleges and Universities. On June 13, 2016, Moridi's cabinet role was reduced to a renamed portfolio of Minister of Research, Innovation and Science. He also served as Chair of the Cabinet Committee on Education, Skills and Economy.

Contributions during Public Service 
In 2015, Moridi launched modernization of the Ontario Students Assistance Program (OSAP) by making tuition free for students from low and middle income families and helped establish York University campus in Markham, e-Campus in Toronto and initiated the process of modernizing the university funding formula and the first ever stand-alone French language university in Ontario.

He signed MOUs with countries such as China, Germany, Czech Republic, UK, Korea, Israel, Denmark, Turkey and Jordan. He led Science and Technology missions to USA (four times), China (twice), Korea, Germany (twice), Czech Republic, Israel (twice), West Bank (twice), Jordan, Turkey, Armenia and Azerbaijan and led Nuclear Energy delegations to China and Korea.

Voluntary Community Service since departure from politics 

Since he left politics, Moridi has been serving on the following volunteer positions:
 Senior Fellow, Massey College, University of Toronto 
 Chair of Dean's Special Advisory Board, York University Faculty of Science 
 Chair, Board of Directors, Radiation Safety Institute of Canada 
 Chair, Honorary Advisory Board, Canada Innovative SMEs Association 
 Chair, Board of Honorary Mentors, Outstanding Teenagers Leadership Foundation 
 Trustee, Royal Canadian Institute for Science 
 Trustee, Canadian Society of Iranian Engineers, and Architects 
 Honorary Governor, Mon Sheong Foundation 
 Advisory Board, Yara Leadership Society

Coincidental Involvement in Controversy 

In 2007, Moridi "found himself stuck" in a $200,000 "slush fund" scandal that was dominating Ontario politics at the time. Concerns arose when the Iranian-Canadian Community Centre, where Moridi was a sitting board-member at the time, appeared to be one of the 110 agencies receiving portions of $32 million grants allegedly with the lack of formal application processes, public notices, meeting minutes/records and unclear selection criteria. When concerns over the transparency of the application process were raised by opposition parties, Moridi and other board-members quit this centre, and responded by stating that they do not believe the money dedicated to the organization should be returned. New Democrat MPP Michael Prue demanded clarity on the group "to put the government grant to use in helping Iranian immigrants attempting to settle in the Greater Toronto Area".

In January 2016, Moridi was criticized for allowing two Ontario colleges to open satellite campuses in Saudi Arabia that only accepted male students. He said that administration of such places are up to each college's board of governors. He said, "What has become clear is that further engagement needs to take place between the government and Ontario's college sector on this important issue. I will be reaching out to Algonquin College and Niagara College immediately to receive a full update on their international activities."

In 2018, in a rally against the Iranian regime's crack down of protests in 95 cities in Iran, Moridi quoted the Iranian people who had called death to the Iranian president Hassan Rouhani. In the Iranian political culture and Persian language, saying 'Marg bar' [death to] means "down with".

Cabinet positions

Awards and recognition 
On October 12, 2018, the Iranian community of the Greater Toronto Area organized a tribute dinner honouring Reza Moridi where in recognition of his service to the Town of Richmond Hill, the Town named one of the streets “Urmia Avenue” -  after the ancient city of Urmia in Iran where Moridi was born.

Human rights
Moridi has been active in support of human rights in his homeland Iran.  In 2009, he presented a petition to the legislature regarding the violation of human rights in Iran in the aftermath of the 2009 presidential election. He advocated for the passing of the legislation in the House of Commons of Canada on June 5, 2013, that proclaimed massacre of political prisoner in Iran by the order of Ayatollah Khomeini during the summer of 1988, was a crime against humanity.  He also introduced a petition that asked the Federal Minister of Foreign Affairs to intervene on Saeed Malekpour's behalf and appeal to the government of Iran to free him.

In May 2010, he read a statement in praise of the Republic of Azerbaijan in honour of the nation's anniversary in which he called the current government of Azerbaijan "a secular democratic republic".

Electoral record

References

Notes

Citations

External links

1945 births
21st-century Canadian politicians
Alumni of Brunel University London
Canadian people of Azerbaijani descent
Canadian politicians of Iranian descent
Iranian emigrants to Canada
Living people
Members of the Executive Council of Ontario
Ontario Liberal Party MPPs
People from Richmond Hill, Ontario
People from Urmia